Battle of Two Flowers is a 2018 Burmese legal drama television series. It aired on MRTV, from January 3, to March 9, 2018, on every Wednesday, Thursday and Friday at 19:15 for 30 episodes.

Cast
Paing Phyo Thu as Shwe Zawar
May Barani Thaw as May Khattar
Soe Yan Aung as Theinkha
Htet Ko Ko Lin as La Pyae Aung
Marco as Ye Lin Htun
Yan Kyaw as U Ye Kyaw
Ko Ko Lin Maung as U Htut Khaung
Than Than Soe as Mother of May Khattar
Khin Thazin as Jessica

Awards

References

Burmese television series
MRTV (TV network) original programming